The Legion Academy is a training school for members of the Legion of Super-Heroes. It was created by Jim Shooter and Curt Swan, and has been re-used and revisited by subsequent creator in the many evolving iterations of the Legion that have been published over the decades. The Academy is both a source of supporting characters and subplots for the ongoing Legion titles (which have an established history of searches, competitions and understudies meant to expand the roster), and has also groomed several characters for eventual starring roles. Chemical King, Dawnstar, Karate Kid II, Magnetic Kid, Tellus and Timber Wolf are all graduates of the Academy. Training there may be deficient to some degree, however, as Chemical King, Karate Kid II and Magnetic Kid have all died in the line of battle, though as two of those were selfless sacrifices made to save others, they clearly teach heroism quite well.

In recent stories, the Academy has been run by long-term Legionnaires Duplicate Damsel and Bouncing Boy, a married couple who take on quasi-parental roles with the students. Also assisting is Night Girl, a former Substitute Legionnaire and one time lover of Legion leader Cosmic Boy. The most recent cast included a mix of older and new characters including Power Boy, Gravity Kid, Chemical Kid, Variable Lad, Glorith and Dragonwing.

References

External links 
 dc.wikia.com

Superhero schools
Legion of Super-Heroes